Jorge León "Nene" Araneta is a prominent Filipino businessman. He chairs the Araneta Group of Companies which is engaged in property development, lodging and hospitality (Araneta City, Novotel Manila Araneta City, Ibis Styles Araneta City), food and dining (Pizza Hut, Taco Bell, and Dairy Queen Philippine franchise holder), entertainment and leisure  (Araneta Coliseum, New Frontier Theater), and beauty and philanthropy (Binibining Pilipinas Charities, Inc., J. Amado Araneta Foundation). He is also a director of Philippine Seven Corporation (Philippine franchisee of 7-Eleven) and co-founder of Medical Doctors Inc. (owner and operator of Makati Medical Center).

He also serves as a Consul at the Colombian Embassy.

Early life and education

Araneta was born in Manila, Commonwealth of the Philippines and is the son of J. Amado Araneta and Ester Bustamante Araneta, as the second and the only son of three siblings. He finished high school at the De La Salle University in Manila and holds a Bachelor of Science in Business Administration (BSBA) from the University of the Philippines Diliman, where he was a member of the Upsilon Sigma Phi fraternity.

Business career

During his teenage years, he worked closely with his father since after graduating college, and steadily rose through the ranks of the family business, until in 1970, he took the helm of his father's company, the Araneta Group, and his related businesses after his retirement. Under his helm, he further expanded the family business, from real estate to agriculture, investments and food and dining services, which gave rise to some of the country's many firsts, such as the development of the Fiesta Carnival in 1971, the country's first indoor amusement park; the Farmers Market in 1975, one of best and the largest wet markets in the country; the Ali Mall in 1976, which became the first indoor enclosed mall in the country; and many commercial establishments throughout the 1980s. Due to the area's attractive location and its close proximity to entertainment venues, this enticed some businesses that were primarily based in Manila to establish their business at the Araneta Center, in order to expand their respective businesses, such as the SM Cubao, one of the first and the largest SM Department Store in the country, and opened in October 1978; the Rustan's Superstore, designed by Carlos A. Santos-Viola; the National Book Store Superbranch, designed by Rogelio Garcia Villarosa, which opened in 1972, before being upgraded into a 9-storey building in 1982; the New Farmers Plaza Shopping Center, the Marikina Shoe Expo; the Aurora Tower, which was completed in 1984; and the Araneta Center Bus Terminal, which opened in 1993 and became the country's first and oldest integrated bus terminal. The development also included the renovation of the Araneta Coliseum in 1999. Araneta also inherited his father's wealth after his death in 1985.

As the Araneta Center's glory began to wither in the late 1980s amidst many hurdles, from the massive fire that hit the Farmers Plaza to the company's financial problems, the numerous coups against the Presidency of Corazon Aquino and the 1997 Asian financial crisis, the Araneta Group struggled to redevelop the area in the 1990s and temporarily halted any property development projects in Cubao and in property investment projects in Makati City until in 1997, as he saw the development of major rail lines, the LRT Line 2 and the MRT Line 3, located adjacent to the complex. After seeing the potential to revive the complex from its distress, due to the area's location and connectivity to vital areas around Metro Manila, Araneta vowed to finish his father's vision and saw the opportunity of transforming the Araneta Center into a transit-oriented development with a garden city concept and spearheaded the planning of the Araneta Center Redevelopment Plan in 1999–2000, and the program's implementation in 2002, with the construction of the Gateway Mall and its completion in 2004.

The redevelopment master plan also led the construction of the Manhattan Garden City in 2006, which became the first transit-oriented residential development; the Araneta Center Cyberpark in 2007, including the present-day Cyberpark Master Plan in 2014; the Gateway Tower in 2010, the Novotel Manila Araneta City in 2012, and the New Gateway Mall and Ibis Styles Araneta City in 2018. The master plan also included the second renovation of the Araneta Coliseum and the Farmers Plaza in 2012, the revival project of the New Frontier Theater in 2014, and the renovation of Ali Mall, SM Cubao, and Shopwise Supermarket, which were all completed in 2010. In 2019, Araneta rebranded the complex, from the Araneta Center to the Araneta City as "the city of firsts".

As the redevelopment plan continues in full swing, Araneta has also planned to build more properties to the Araneta City, such as the Gateway Mall 3, the Civic Plaza, the Icon tower, an integrated resort with a heritage area, and a 4-tower mixed-use development within Ali Mall. Araneta aims to complete the Araneta City master plan within 2030, under his company's Vision 2030 plan, which aims to develop   square meters of gross floor area within the mixed use development.

Personal life
In 1964, he married Stella Márquez-Araneta, a Colombian Beauty Queen from a Spanish and Polish heritage, at the Metropolitan Cathedral of Saint Peter in Cali, Colombia, and sharing in five children.

He is also a known traveller, a cockfighter, and a wine collector, where he also owns a wine shop in Novotel Manila Araneta Center, named Sabor Bar de Vinos. He also loves eating Italian Food.

Awards
 2017 DLSAA Distinguished Lasallian
 Top Five Best Employers in Asia (Philippines) by the Hewitt Association and the Wall Street Journal, 2003
 Pioneer of Retail Entertainment and PRA President's Award by the Philippine Retailers Association.

References

1936 births
20th-century Filipino businesspeople
21st-century Filipino businesspeople
Araneta family
Living people
Real estate and property developers